Lorenzo Gignous (1862 in Modena – 1958 in Porto Ceresio, Varese) was an Italian painter.

Biography
The nephew of the painter Eugenio Gignous, Lorenzo studied at the Brera Academy and was awarded the Mylius Prize for historic landscape painting there in 1884. The artists were free to choose their subject that year, and he presented a view of Sesto Calende on Lake Maggiore, where Garibaldi and the regiments of Alpine chasseurs disembarked in May 1859. This landscape became a recurrent subject and indeed a characteristic theme of all his strongly naturalistic oeuvre. He took part in the major national exhibitions of the period and soon established himself as a landscape painter with a repertoire of views of Lake Maggiore painted from life during stays at Stresa with Eugenio Gignous, who settled there with his family in 1887.

Lorenzo Gignous combined his activities as a painter until 1922 with employment for the Italian Railway, which enabled him to obtain important commissions for public works.

Bibliography
 Elena Lissoni, Lorenzo Gignous, online catalogue Artgate by Fondazione Cariplo, 2010, CC BY-SA (source for the first revision of this article).

Other projects

19th-century Italian painters
19th-century Italian male artists
Italian male painters
20th-century Italian painters
20th-century Italian male artists
Painters from Modena
Brera Academy alumni
1862 births
1958 deaths